Chekhovo is a settlement in Bagrationovsky District of Kaliningrad Oblast, Russia.

Rural localities in Kaliningrad Oblast